General Sir Thomas Erskine Napier  (10 May 1790 – 5 July 1863) was a British Army officer who became Commander-in-Chief, Scotland.

Military career
Napier was commissioned into the 52nd Regiment of Foot on 3 July 1805. He took part in the Battle of Copenhagen in August 1807, at the Battle of Corunna in January 1809 and at the Battle of Fuentes de Oñoro in May 1811 during the Napoleonic Wars. He also took part in the Battle of the Nive in December 1813 where he was wounded. He went on to be assistant adjutant-general in Belfast and then served as Commander-in-Chief, Scotland and also as Governor of Edinburgh Castle from 1852 to 1854. From 1854 to 1857 he was Colonel of the 16th (Bedfordshire) Regiment and from 1857 to his death Colonel of the 71st (Highland) Regiment of Foot. 

He was the brother of Admiral Sir Charles Napier.

References

 

|-

|-

|-

1790 births
1863 deaths
British Army generals
British Army personnel of the Napoleonic Wars
Knights Commander of the Order of the Bath
52nd Regiment of Foot officers
People from Govan